In ecology, base-richness is the level of chemical bases in water or soil, such as calcium or magnesium ions.  Many organisms prefer base-rich environments. Chemical bases are alkalis, hence base-rich environments are either neutral or alkaline.  Because acid-rich environments have few bases, they are dominated by environmental acids (usually organic acids).  However, the relationship between base-richness and acidity is not a rigid one – changes in the levels of acids (such as dissolved carbon dioxide) may significantly change acidity without affecting base-richness.  

Base-rich terrestrial environments are characteristic of areas where underlying rocks (below soil) are limestone. Seawater is also base-rich, so maritime and marine environments are themselves base-rich.

Base-poor environments are characteristic of areas where underlying rocks (below soil) are sandstone or granite, or where the water is derived directly from rainfall (ombrotrophic).

Examples of base-rich environments
 Calcareous grassland
 Fen
 Limestone pavement
 Maquis shrubland
 Yew woodland

Examples of base-poor environments
 Bog
 Heath (habitat)
 Poor fen
 Moorland
 Pine woodland
 Tundra

See also
Soil
Calcicole
Calcifuge

Ecology
Soil chemistry